William Thomas Cox (1878–1961) was the first State Forester and Commissioner of Conservation for Minnesota. Cox worked as a forester for the United States Forest Service prior to his appointment as State Forester. After leaving office, in 1929, Cox traveled to Brazil to organize the Brazilian Forest Service including exhaustive exploration of the Amazon Basin. Returning to the United States in 1931, Cox was appointed as the first Commissioner of Conservation for Minnesota.

Writing
Cox was an avid writer and wrote heavily on forestry, nature, and conservation topics. Cox contributed a recurring column in the magazine The Farmer and exerts of which were later published as Wild Animals of the Field and Forest and, with coauthor Dietrich Lange, Bird Stories. Cox is perhaps best known today for his collection of folkloric sketches,  Fearsome Creatures of the Lumberwoods, with a Few Desert and Mountain Beasts, a chief literary resource on fearsome critters of North American folklore.

See also
 Fearsome Creatures of the Lumberwoods
 Fearsome Critters
 United States Forest Service

References

External links 
 William T. Cox, Minnesota's First State Forester
 Letter from President Theodore Roosevelt to William T. Cox

1878 births
American foresters
1961 deaths